Giovanni-Battista Orlandi (27 January 1898 – 1970) was an Italian sprinter. He competed in the men's 100 metres at the 1920 Summer Olympics.

References

External links
 

1898 births
1970 deaths
Athletes (track and field) at the 1920 Summer Olympics
Italian male sprinters
Olympic athletes of Italy
Athletes from Milan